Julius Barnathan (January 22, 1927 – December 1, 1997) was an American broadcast engineer. Barnathan was President of Broadcast Operations and Engineering for American Broadcasting Company (ABC). During his 40 years at ABC, he was responsible for many technical developments in the television industry, including the use of handheld and miniature cameras at sports events and closed captioned programs for the deaf. He is also credited with helping to adapt slow-motion technology to color cameras, develop the use of long-lens cameras to capture sports events that take place over great distances, and introduce the use of small square inset pictures behind news anchors.

Awards and recognitions
 National Academy of Television Arts and Sciences - The Silver Circle, 1996 
 NAB Engineering Achievement Award - April 13, 1982 
 National Academy of Television Arts and Sciences - The Trustees Awards, 1984-1985

References

1927 births
1997 deaths
20th-century American engineers
Broadcast engineering
American electronics engineers
American Broadcasting Company people